Joseph A. Greenwald (September 18, 1918 – October 30, 2000) was an American diplomat who served as the United States Ambassador to the Organisation for Economic Co-operation and Development from 1969 to 1972, the United States Ambassador to the European Union from 1972 to 1976 and as the Assistant Secretary of State for Economic and Business Affairs in 1976.

He died of leukemia on October 30, 2000, in Washington, D.C. at age 82.

References

1918 births
2000 deaths
Ambassadors of the United States to the Organisation for Economic Co-operation and Development
Ambassadors of the United States to the European Union
United States Assistant Secretaries of State
20th-century American diplomats